Mariusz Malec (born 4 April 1995) is a Polish professional footballer who plays as a centre-back for Pogoń Szczecin.

References

Polish footballers
1995 births
Living people
Polonia Bytom players
Olimpia Grudziądz players
Podbeskidzie Bielsko-Biała players
Pogoń Szczecin players
Association football defenders
Ekstraklasa players
III liga players
Sportspeople from Chorzów